Shankar Saini (born 8 July 1964) is an Indian former cricketer. He played twenty first-class matches for Delhi between 1986 and 1991.

See also
 List of Delhi cricketers

References

External links
 

1964 births
Living people
Indian cricketers
Delhi cricketers
Cricketers from Delhi